Waqar Masood Khan is a retired Pakistani civil servant who served as Advisor to Prime Minister Imran Khan on Revenue and Finance in the capacity of a Minister of State in Cabinet, in office from October 2020. Before his retirement from civil services, Waqar served in BPS-22 grade as Pakistan's longest running Secretary of Finance.

Khan has held several positions across the Federal Government including Special Secretary to the Prime Minister, Secretary Finance Division, Secretary Economic Affairs Division, Secretary Petroleum & Natural Resources and Secretary Textile Industry. He taught macroeconomics at the graduate level at Pakistan Institute of Development Economics (PIDE).

Khan has also served as a board member of State Bank of Pakistan, Islamic Development Bank, National Bank of Pakistan, Pakistan International Airlines, Pakistan Telecommunication Company Limited (PTCL) and Pak-Oman Investment Company. More recently, Khan has been appointed Chairman of the Board of SadaPay, a fintech company in the private sector that is operating under the Electronic Money Institution regulatory framework by the State Bank of Pakistan.

Writings
Article
 "Towards an Interest-Free Islamic Economic System", Journal of King Abdulaziz University: Islamic Economics, Vol. 1, 1989, pp. 3-38.
Book
 Transition to a Riba Free Economy, International Institute of Islamic Thought and Islamic Research Institute, 2002, 144 p.

References

External links

Pakistani civil servants
Boston University alumni
Pakistan International Airlines people
Finance Secretaries of Pakistan
Pakistani bankers
Year of birth missing (living people)
Living people